John Joseph Cavanaugh III (born August 1, 1945) is an American politician and lawyer from Nebraska.

Early life and education 
Born in Omaha, Nebraska, he graduated from Creighton Preparatory School in 1963, from Regis College in Denver, Colorado in 1967 and from Creighton University School of Law in 1972,. He was admitted to the bar in 1972 and set up practice in Omaha.

Career 
From 1968 to 1970 he served in the United States Army. In 1972 he was elected to the Nebraska Legislature and served until 1976 when he was elected to represent Nebraska's 2nd district in the Ninety-fifth United States Congress. He was reelected to the Ninety-sixth United States Congress serving from January 3, 1977, to January 3, 1981. He did not run for reelection in 1980, opting to resume his law practice in Omaha. He is a Catholic and was a delegate for Nebraska to the Democratic National Convention of 1980, 2000, and 2004. Cavanaugh is a member of the ReFormers Caucus of Issue One.

References

 
 
 
 
 John J. Cavanaugh, III - Martindale-Hubbell Law Profile

1945 births
Living people
Nebraska lawyers
Democratic Party Nebraska state senators
Politicians from Omaha, Nebraska
Creighton University School of Law alumni
Regis University alumni
United States Army soldiers
Democratic Party members of the United States House of Representatives from Nebraska